Sir Murray Love Hammick,  (11 May 18544 March 1936) was an Indian civil servant and administrator who acted as the Governor of Madras from 30 March 1912 to 30 October 1912.

Early life 
Murray Hammick was born on 11 May 1854 to Rev. Sir Vincent Love Hammick Bart (1806-1888) and Mary Alexander.

In the Indian Civil Service 
Muray Hammick graduated from the Fell King's College and joined the Indian Civil Service after clearing the exams in 1875. He arrived in India on December 18, 1877 and served as Sub Collector in the Madras President and as Assistant Commissioner of Coorg. He served as the Inspector-General of police of Madras from 1894 to 1906 when he was appointed Chief Secretary to the Madras government. In 1908, Hammick was appointed to the Executive Council of the Governor of Madras and served from 1908 to March 1912, when he was chosen to act as the Governor of Madras until the arrival of the governor-designate John Sinclair, 1st Baron Pentland in October 1912.

Governor of Madras
Hammick acted as the Governor of Madras from 30 March 1912 to 30 October 1912.

Post-gubernatorial career 
In 1913, Hammick was appointed member of the Royal Commission to inquire into the Civil Services in India. In 1915, Hammick was appointed to the Council of State and served as a member from 1915 to 1922.

Family 
Murray Hammick married Ada Constance Searle, daughter of Major-General Arthur Thaddeus Searle, on 11 December 1883. The couple had two sons and three daughters.

 Lorna Mary Hammick
 Dorothy Constance Hammick
 Lucy Mabel Hammick
 Major Henry Alexander Hammick  (1890–1968), after obtaining an engineering degree from Cambridge University he became a major in the 6th Battalion of the Manchester Regiment and saw service during World War I. After the war he rose to Chief Engineer of the Iraq Petroleum Company. During World War II he worked in the Petroleum Warfare Department and was co-inventor of the HAMEL PLUTO D-Day pipeline system as well as a lance corporal in the Home Guard.
 John Murray Hammick - died as an infant in India in 1901

Honours 
Hammick was appointed a Companion of the Order of the Indian Empire (CIE) in November 1901. He was appointed a Companion of the Order of the Star of India (CSI) in 1907 and raised to a Knight Commander (KCSI) of the order in 1911.

Other interests 
Hammick was also a prominent freemason and was the provincial grandmaster of the District Grand Lodge of Madras from 1910 to 1914.

Notes

Works

Further reading 
 

1854 births
1936 deaths
Companions of the Order of the Indian Empire
Knights Commander of the Order of the Star of India
Freemasons of the United Grand Lodge of England